The following is a list of presenters with Al Jazeera Media Network, the international news conglomerate, based in Doha and financed by the Qatari government. In recent years Al Jazeera developed a presence in the global English-language broadcasting sector, firstly with the Al Jazeera English channel and then with the purchase of Current TV, which led to the launch of the United States-based Al Jazeera America in 2013.

This list includes former employees as well as the current presenters:

Al Jazeera English

Dareen Abughaida
Hashem Ahelbarra
Charlie Angela
Winsyon Murphy
Mohamed Adow
Malika Bilal
Marwan Bishara
Richelle Carey
Nick Clark
Stephen Cole
Peter Dobbie
Jane Dutton
Ghida Fakhry
Adrian Finighan
Martine Dennis
Lisa Fletcher
Everton Fox
Steve Gaisford
Imran Garda
Steff Gaulter
Shiulie Ghosh
Richard Gizbert
Divya Gopalan
Tony Harris
Mehdi Hasan
Fauziah Ibrahim
Darren Jordon
Rizwan Khan
Hamish Macdonald
Julie MacDonald
Raheela Mahomed
Rob Matheson
Rob McElwee
Halla Mohieddeen
Teymoor Nabili
Anand Naidoo
Maryam Nemazee
Femi Oke
Rageh Omaar
Marga Ortigas
Shahnaz Pakravan
Amanda Palmer
Verónica Pedrosa
Barnaby Phillips
Faisal al-Qassem
Robert Reynolds
Andy Richardson
Josh Rushing
Maleen Saeed
Kamahl Santamaria
Shakuntala Santhiran
Nick Schifrin
Mark Seddon
Barbara Serra
Sherine Tadros
Nastasya Tay
Lauren Taylor
Folly Bah Thibault
Cyril Vanier
Kim Vinnell
Sebastian Walker
Sami Zeidan
Sandra Gathmann

Al Jazeera America

Josh Bernstein
Jonathan Betz
Chris Bury
Richelle Carey
Melissa Chan
Joie Chen
Eboni Deon
Lisa Fletcher
Jami Floyd
Lori Jane Gliha
Tony Harris
Marc Lamont Hill
Sheila MacVicar
Dave Marash
Adam May
Nichole Mitchell 
Antonio Mora
Soledad O'Brien
Femi Oke
Randall Pinkston
Christof Putzel
Ash-har Quraishi
Morgan Radford
Josh Rushing
Roxana Saberi
Cara Santa Maria
Nick Schifrin
John Seigenthaler
Michael Shure
David Shuster
John Henry Smith
Ray Suarez
Stephanie Sy
Ali Velshi
Mike Viqueira
Sebastian Walker
Amy Walters
Jacob Ward

Al Jazeera Balkans

 Aleksandar Ćeramilac
 Anne-Marie Ćurčić
 Saša Delić
 Dalija Hasanbegović
 Jasmina Kos
 Irena Kuldija
 Jelena Milutinović
 Adnan Rondić

See also

List of Qatar-related topics
List of television presenters
List of television reporters

External links
AlJazeera.net (in Arabic) Al Jazeera official website
Al Jazeera English official website
Al Jazeera America official website

Al Jazeera
 
Lists of journalists
Lists of people by employer
Lists of television presenters
Qatar-related lists